Solvent Red 26, also known as Oil Red EGN or C.I. 26120, is a purplish red synthetic azo dye.  It is soluble in oils and insoluble in water.

Its main use is as a standard fuel dye in the US mandated by the US IRS to distinguish low-taxed or tax exempt heating oil from automotive diesel fuel, and by the EPA to mark fuels with higher sulfur content; it is however increasingly replaced with Solvent Red 164, a similar dye with longer alkyl chains, which is better soluble in hydrocarbons. The concentration required by IRS is a spectral equivalent of 3.9 pounds per 1000 barrels, or 11.13 mg/L, of Solvent Red 26 in solid form; the concentrations required by EPA are roughly 5 times lower.

See also 
 Solvent Red 27
 Solvent Red 164

References

Azo dyes
Solvent dyes
Fuel dyes
2-Naphthols